In Mexico, anti-monuments (Spanish: antimonumentos) are installed and traditionally placed during popular protests. They are installed to recall a tragic event or to maintain the claim for justice to which governments have failed to provide a satisfactory response in the eyes of the complainant.

Many of these are erected for issues related to forced disappearances, massacres, femicides and other forms of violence against women, or any other act of violence.

Concept 

The term anti-monument finds its genealogy in the reflections of James E. Young. After World War II, Young looked at "those devices of memory that do not seek to glorify national glory but to do a living memory work through the experiences of the victims", in contrast to the traditional monuments that exalted nationalist heroism. Young used the term counter-monument to refer to this type of expression. He exemplified this with the Monument Against Fascism (Hamburg, 1986) by Jochen Gerz and Esther Shalev-Gerz. It consisted of a twelve-meter-high stele on which passers-by could write their names or any kind of reflection, so that little by little the stele would be hidden to "embody the absence of fascism".

However, according to this classification, it is difficult to locate their origin, since there are many actions that could be classified as anti-monuments, at least since 1977. In Latin America, anti-monuments emerged as a way of dealing through the arts with "the violence of the State, as in the cases of Nazism and Latin American dictatorships".

In Mexico, anti-monuments have emerged as a rejection of the state. If traditional monuments are usually installed by the state to last and represent official positions, the anti-monument has the opposite function which "does not imply a denial of the importance of monuments". That is, it tries to remember those victims who did not achieve justice so that "their cases do not fall into oblivion". Thus, according to anthropologist Alfonso Díaz Tovar, the anti-monuments arise in this way to "deconstruct" the "official positions through an appropriation of public space".

The anti-monuments have also been interpreted as "a new way of dealing with the new role of memory". According to the authors of the Antimonumento +43, the first anti-monument, they decided to use the term antimonumento because they considered an error to name it a monumento, as those refer to the past and they did not want the Iguala mass kidnapping to be forgotten. Even though they considered calling it contramonumento at some point, they agreed with the name antimonumento instead.

Cause and implications 

Mexico is a country where nine out of ten reported crimes are left unpunished. As a result, anti-monuments have emerged as a way to remember the victims and prevent their cases from falling into oblivion. For Rosa Salazar, a human rights, communication, and ICT Laboratory coordinator, anti-monuments have a function similar to that of memorials.

Anti-monuments leave behind the idea that aesthetic objects "were only judged by their beauty, according to a given artistic canon". Apart from their aesthetic appearance, anti-monuments are "artifacts charged with affection" that, with their subversive activities in the public space, tend to reinstate its communitarian sense. For Eunice Hernández, a cultural facilitator, their location is key to prevent the issue from fading into oblivion, since those spaces are emblematic and represent a hegemonic power.

Government position 
Anti-monuments are rarely removed by the authorities once they are established. Although not removing them can affect the image of the government, removing them would imply that they have no interest in resolving the cause of their placement. After being installed, several sit-in groups remain in the area watching over the anti-monuments to prevent the  authorities from removing them.

In some instances, some governments have installed their own anti-monuments and in other cases have tried to dialogue with the protesters to decide where or how they should be installed. For philosopher Irene Tello Arista, these actions represent an absence of political commitment to change the situation that originated them.

Antimonumenta 

The antimonumenta is a type of anti-monument erected to demand justice for the victims of gender violence and femicides in the country.

The first antimonumenta was erected on 8 March 2019, the date commemorating International Women's Day. It was installed on Juárez Avenue, in front of the Palace of Fine Arts in downtown Mexico City during the annual march of women protesting against gender violence. Since then, similar monuments have been installed throughout the country.

The Antimonumenta represents the symbol of the feminist struggle, which is based on the symbol of Venus with a raised fist in the center. The antimonumentas of Mexico City and Guadalajara, for example, are purple. The color represents the history of the feminist struggle: "loyalty, constancy towards a purpose, unwavering firmness towards a cause".

List of anti-monuments

See also

 Feminism in Mexico
 Guerrilla sculpture
 Memorial to Victims of Violence in Mexico, a memorial installed by the government in 2013
 Monumento a los Niños Héroes (Guadalajara), a traffic circle in which the city authorities allowed the transformation into a memorial

Notes

References

Further reading

External links 

 
Feminism in Mexico
Monuments and memorials in Mexico